Peace Bridge is a bridge over the Niagara River, linking Canada and the United States.

Peace Bridge may also refer to:

Bridges:
 Peace Bridge (Calgary), a pedestrian bridge crossing the Bow River in Calgary, Alberta, Canada
 Peace Bridge (Foyle), a bridge in Derry, County Londonderry, Northern Ireland, built as part of the City of Culture 2013 project
 Peace Bridge (Mongolia), a bridge in the center of the city of Ulan Bator, Mongolia
 The Bridge of Peace (Georgia), a pedestrian bridge in Tbilisi, Georgia
 Passerelle de la Paix (Peace Bridge), a pedestrian bridge in Lyon, France
 Senator George Mitchell Peace Bridge, informally called the Peace Bridge, between Counties Fermanagh and Cavan on the Ireland - United Kingdom border

Other:
 Peace Bridge (album), a 2007 album by John & Mary